Juliane Seyfarth (born 19 February 1990) is a German ski jumper.

Career
She made her debut in the Continental Cup, the highest level in women's ski jumping, on 23 July 2004 with a 13th place in Park City. She has finished among the top three 15 times, with seven wins and seven-second places.

On 5 February 2006, she became the first official junior world champion in ski jumping, after winning the women's competition 2006 Nordic Junior World Ski Championships in Kranj.

She was selected to compete for Germany in the 2011 World Championship in Oslo. She represents WSC 07 Ruhla club.

World Championship results

World Cup

Standings

Individual wins

External links

1990 births
Living people
German female ski jumpers
Ski jumpers at the 2018 Winter Olympics
Ski jumpers at the 2022 Winter Olympics
Olympic ski jumpers of Germany
FIS Nordic World Ski Championships medalists in ski jumping
People from Eisenach
Sportspeople from Thuringia
21st-century German women